The 1990 UEFA European Under-21 Championship, which spanned two years (1988–90), had 30 entrants. San Marino competed for the first time. USSR U-21s won the competition.

The 30 national teams were divided into eight groups (six groups of 4 + two groups of 3). The group winners played off against each other on a two-legged home-and-away basis until the winner was decided.  There was no finals tournament or 3rd-place playoff.

Qualifying stage

Draw
The allocation of teams into qualifying groups was based on that of 1990 FIFA World Cup qualification with several changes, reflecting the absence of some nations:
 Groups 1 and 2 featured the same nations
 Group 3 did not include Iceland (moved to Group 4)
 Group 4 did not include Wales, but included Iceland (moved from Group 3)
 Group 5 did not include Cyprus (moved to Group 6)
 Group 6 did not include Republic of Ireland, Northern Ireland and Malta, but included Cyprus (moved from Group 5)
 Group 7 did not include Switzerland (moved to Group 8)
 Group 8 composed of Switzerland (moved from Group 7), Italy and San Marino (both of whom did not participate in World Cup qualification)

Qualified teams

1 Bold indicates champion for that year

Knockout stage

Quarter-finals

First leg

Second leg

Semi-finals

First leg

Second leg

Final

First leg

Second leg

Goalscorers

3 goals
 Davor Šuker 
 Andriy Sydelnykov

2 goals

 Giovanni Stroppa
 Kennet Andersson
 Tomas Brolin
 Ulrik Jansson
 Igor Shalimov
 Igor Dobrovolskiy
 Alen Bokšić

1 goal

 Horst Siegl
 Christian Hochstätter
 Pierluigi Casiraghi
 Marco Simone
 Fernando Hierro
 Ricardo Mendiguren
 Stefan Rehn
 Dmitriy Chugunov
 Igor Kolyvanov
 Andrey Kanchelskis
 Sergey Kiryakov
 Aleksandr Mostovoi
 Zvonimir Boban
 Robert Jarni
 Robert Prosinečki

Own goal
 Andriy Bal (playing against West Germany)
 Miroslav Đukić (playing against Italy)

References

External links 
 Results Archive at uefa.com
 RSSSF Results Archive ''at rsssf.com

UEFA European Under-21 Championship
UEFA
UEFA
1990 in youth association football